Robert Howe (1832-1915) was a Democratic politician who served in the California State Assembly and California State Senate, also serving as the Speaker of the Assembly in 1899.

Life 
Howe was born in New York, the son of Abraham Howe and Elizabeth Littlejohn, but moved to California in 1853 where he worked in gold mines in Tuolumne County before being a commission merchant in San Francisco. He served in the California State Assembly as a Democrat from the 7th district between 1858 and 1861 and later from the 8th district between 1873 and 1875, serving as Speaker pro-tempore of the Assembly. He then served in the California State Senate from the 13th district between 1875 and 1881. He returned to the Assembly in 1888, this time from the 25th district, and he became Speaker of the Assembly in 1899. He left the Assembly in 1890 and died in 1915.

References 

1832 births
1915 deaths
Speakers of the California State Assembly